The 2011 Canadian Soccer League season (known as the Givova Canadian Soccer League for sponsorship reasons) was the 14th since its establishment where a total of 28 teams from Ontario and Quebec took part in the league. The season began on Saturday 6 May 2011, and concluded on 29 October 2011. Toronto Croatia won their fourth championship (seventh including Canadian National Soccer League titles) in a 1–0 victory over Capital City F.C. in the CSL Championship final at Centennial Park Stadium in Toronto. The regular season saw SC Toronto claim their second regular season title, while Mississauga Eagles FC B won their first Second Division championship. The season saw an increase in membership to 14 teams the largest number since the 2002 season. The new entries saw the return of professional soccer to the communities of Windsor, Mississauga, and Ottawa.

After one season as commissioner Domenic Di Gironimo resigned with Vincent Ursini returning to be named his successor. The 2011 season witnessed the fruits of the CSL player developmental system as nine CSL players were selected to represent the Canada U-17 in the 2011 CONCACAF U-17 Championship. While 14 CSL players participated in the 2011 FIFA U-17 World Cup, and 4 players were selected to represent the Canada U-20 in the 2011 CONCACAF U-20 Championship. To further implement their developmental system the league formed a working relationship with the newly formed Canadian Academy of Futbol (CAF), which required their member clubs to form affiliations with academy teams.

The ownership structure of the league was reformed into an incorporated body as the CSL Association Inc in order to bring about a slow process of equalization to the status of teams, while compensating the equity owners who had heavily invested in league throughout the years. The reserve division was renamed the Second Division and grew to a record number of 14 clubs. As a result, in the increase of teams the division was further split into an East and West division. The second division continued its traditional support role as reserve teams to First Division squads, and as an entry level division for teams that haven't met the standards for a first division club. Their television deal with Rogers TV included a new broadcasting record of 70 regular season matches, and have expanded their original coverage of Toronto teams to include the cities of London, Brantford, Mississauga, and Ottawa.

Changes from 2010
The CSL operated 2 divisions in 2011; First and Second. The reserve division has been referred to in some media releases as CSL II.

The Givova Cup play-offs were announced to include the top 8 teams. The quarter-final round was played over 2 legs and standard seeding with 1 v 8, 2 v 7, 3 v 6 and 4 v 5.

Teams 
A total of 14 teams contested in the league, including 11 from the 2010 season and three expansion teams.

The league featured two expansion teams, Mississauga Eagles FC, an Ottawa-based team called Capital City, and the return of Windsor Stars. Hamilton Croatia and Milltown FC did not return for the 2011 season after failing to meet the membership deadline for the 2011 season. Milltown FC owner Dino Rossi announced future plans to form a breakaway league under the jurisdiction of the Ontario Soccer Association.

In further changes, two teams changed their name prior to this season. Brampton Lions competed under the name of Brampton United, while Portugal FC were renamed SC Toronto.

Results

Positions by round

Standings

Goal scorers
Final statistics as of 10 October 2011

Playoffs
The top 8 teams will qualify for the 2-legged Quarter-finals with the winners advancing to the one game semi-finals to be hosted by the highest remaining seeds.

Quarterfinals

Semifinals

Givova CSL Championship

CSL Executive Committee and Staff 
The 2011 CSL Executive Committee.

Individual awards 

The annual CSL awards ceremony was held at the Mississauga Convention Centre in Mississauga, Ontario on 14 November 2011. The majority of the awards went to league champions Toronto Croatia. Tihomir Maletic received his second consecutive MVP award, and Sven Arapovic was given the Defender of the Year for his contributions in establishing Toronto's solid defensive record. Velemir Crljen went home with the Coach of the Year, while club president Joe Pavicic was given the Harry Paul Gauss award.

The Golden Boot was taken by Stefan Vukovic of TFC Academy, and Scott Cliff of SC Toronto was voted the Goalkeeper of the Year. Capital City FC produced the Rookie of the Year with Akil DeFreitas, who later went abroad to the Veikkausliiga. Niagara United received their first Fair Play award for being the most disciplined team throughout the season.  The CSL Referee Committee selected David Barrie, a veteran national referee with the Referee of the Year. Rogers TV producer Jeremy Milani was given a special service award for promoting CSL matches throughout the years.

Second Division 

The CSL Second Division was originally set up to be the Reserve League.  In 2011, that was adjusted to include an academy team, Kingston Prospect FC and 2 clubs (Niagara United and Kitchener Waterloo United FC) which didn't meet the standards for a First Division club by the deadline date. Currently there are no formal plans for promotion and relegation. One rule that was implemented in the 2011 season was that teams must have a maximum of 4 U-23 players in their rosters. The division expanded to a record number of 14 teams, and was split into an East and West division. Other new additions to the division was the return of Toronto Croatia's reserve squad, and the debut of London City's reserve team. During the regular season both Niagara United, and SC Toronto B secured their Second Division titles. While in the postseason Mississauga Eagles B defeated Brampton United B to claim their first CSL D2 Championship.

Teams

Second Division East Standings

Second Division West Standings

Final

Top Goal Scorers

Updated: 23 October 2016
Source: https://web.archive.org/web/20111114235010/http://canadiansoccerleague.com/

Individual awards

International Friendlies 
Toronto Croatia participated in the 2nd Croatian World Club Championship in order to defend their title. They successfully claimed their second championship after defeating Canberra Croatia.

References

External links
 Canadian Soccer League

2011
Canadian Soccer League
Canadian Soccer League